Dunleith Township is one of twenty-three townships in Jo Daviess County, Illinois, USA.  As of the 2010 census, its population was 3,820 and it contained 1,713 housing units.  It was formed from Menominee Township on March 2, 1865.

Geography
Dunleith Township is in the very northwest corner of Illinois, abutting Wisconsin to the north and Iowa to the west across the Mississippi River.

Dunleith is Townships 28 (part) and 29 North, Range 2 (part) West of the Fourth Principal Meridian.

Cities, towns, villages
 East Dubuque.

Major highways
  U.S. Route 20 - east towards Galena and west over the Mississippi River on the Julien Dubuque Bridge to Dubuque, Iowa.

Rivers
 Mississippi River.

Lakes
 Frentress Lake.
 Round Lake.
 Switzer Lake.

Demographics

School districts
 East Dubuque Community Unit School District 119.

Political districts
 Illinois' 16th congressional district.
 State House District 89.
 State Senate District 45.

References
 
 United States Census Bureau 2007 TIGER/Line Shapefiles.
 United States National Atlas.

External links
 Jo Daviess County official site.
 City-Data.com.
 Illinois State Archives.
 Township Officials of Illinois.

Townships in Jo Daviess County, Illinois
Townships in Illinois